Fisher was an American band consisting of songwriter Ron Wasserman and vocalist Kathy Fisher. The band was known for their selling songs through internet marketing; they received a record deal from their success at MP3.com.Their song "I Will Love You" reached #36 on the Billboard Adult Top 40 chart in 2000.

History
Fisher released their first album One independently in early 1999,  featuring the single "I Will Love You".  They were signed by Farmclub.com/Interscope and they released their first album True North in 2000. 

Fisher has enjoyed some mainstream success. "I Will Love You" (a tribute to Brent Mydland, the late keyboardist of the Grateful Dead) was featured in a 2001 episode of Dawson's Creek, a 2001 episode of Roswell and in the 2007 film Death Sentence. It hit #36 on the Billboard Adult Top 40 chart in 2000. "Breakable" was featured in a 2002 episode of Smallville.

Touring
Fisher toured with Oasis and Lisa Loeb before being signed to a major label. In 1998, they toured on the Lilith Fair. They were the only unsigned artist to appear on the tour that year.

Discography

Studio albums
 One (1999)
 True North (2000)
 Uppers & Downers (2002)
 The Lovely Years (2005)
 Acoustic Cafe 2 (2008)
 Water (2009)
 stripped (2010)
 3 (2014)

Singles
 "I Will Love You" (1997)
 "Any Way" (2005)
 "Never Ending" (2014)
 "On My Way V2" - THE NOTHING Video Game Soundtrack (2018)

References

External links
 

Rock music groups from California